Johannes (Jan) Rijpstra (born 15 July 1955, Gouda) is a Dutch politician from the VVD party. He is currently the mayor of Smallingerland.

From 2005 till 2008 Rijpstra was mayor of Tynaarlo.  He was subsequently the mayor of Noordwijk from 2014 until 1 January 2019, when Noordwijk was merged with Noordwijkerhout.  He has also been a member of the Dutch House of Representatives.

Rijpstra has a degree in physical education from the Hanze University of Applied Sciences in Groningen.

References

1955 births
Living people
Mayors in Drenthe
Members of the House of Representatives (Netherlands)
People's Party for Freedom and Democracy politicians
People from Gouda, South Holland
Mayors in South Holland